Dane Smith may refer to:

 Dane Smith (basketball) (born 1989), Canadian basketball player
 Dane Allan Smith, Canadian visual effects producer

See also 
 Dane Bird-Smith (born 1992), Australian racewalker
Dan Smith (disambiguation)